Disney character Hannah Montana (portrayed by Miley Cyrus) has released one live album, twenty one music videos, five soundtracks, two remix albums and four compilation albums, along with 12 singles out of 46 songs.

Cyrus' first musical effort credited to the Montana character was on March 1, 2006, with seven tracks on the show's first soundtrack, which debuted at number one in the United States, and peaked in the top ten on the UK Compilations Chart. The second soundtrack, Hannah Montana 2, topped the charts in the U.S., the Hannah Montana: The Movie soundtrack peaked at number one in Austria, Canada, New Zealand, Spain, the U.S., and Turkey, and Hannah Montana 3 topped the Billboard Kid Albums and Soundtracks charts. The first remix album, Hannah Montana 2: Non-Stop Dance Party, peaked at number seven in the U.S., and the second, Hannah Montana Hits Remixed, peaked at number 103. The first live album, Best of Both Worlds Concert, peaked at number one on the Kid Albums chart. The fifth and final Hannah Montana soundtrack, Hannah Montana Forever, was released on October 19, 2010, peaked at number 11 on the Billboard 200.

20 songs have charted on the Billboard Hot 100. "He Could Be the One" has proved to be the most successful in the United States, peaking at number ten on the chart.

Albums

Soundtrack albums

Live albums

Remix albums

Compilation albums

Karaoke albums

Singles

Other charted songs

Performance videos

See also
Miley Cyrus discography
Billy Ray Cyrus discography
Hannah Montana, the television series
Hannah Montana, the character

Notes

References

Pop music discographies
Discography
Discographies of American artists
Hannah Montana
Country music discographies